This article lists verifiable spaceflight-related accidents and incidents resulting in human fatality or near-fatality during flight or training for crewed space missions, and testing, assembly, preparation or flight of crewed and robotic spacecraft. Not included are accidents or incidents associated with intercontinental ballistic missile (ICBM) tests, fatality or injury to test animals, uncrewed space flights not resulting in human fatality or serious injury, or Soviet or German rocket-powered aircraft projects of World War II. Also not included are alleged unreported Soviet space accidents, which are considered fringe theories by a majority of historians.

, there have been 15 astronaut and 4 cosmonaut fatalities during spaceflight. Astronauts have also died while training for space missions, such as the Apollo 1 launch pad fire that killed an entire crew of three. There have also been some non-astronaut fatalities during spaceflight-related activities. As of 2022, there have been over 188 fatalities in incidents regarding spaceflight.

Astronaut fatalities

During spaceflight
, in-flight accidents have killed 15 astronauts and 4 cosmonauts, in five separate incidents. Three of them had flown above the Kármán line (edge of space), and one was intended to do so. In each case, the entire crew was killed. As a total of 642 people have flown into space under the USAF definition, and 19 of these have died, the current statistical fatality rate is 2.96 percent.

NASA astronauts who died on duty are memorialized at the Space Mirror Memorial at the Kennedy Space Center Visitor Complex in Merritt Island, Florida. Cosmonauts who died on duty under the Soviet Union were generally honored by burial at the Kremlin Wall Necropolis in Moscow. No Soviet or Russian cosmonauts have died during spaceflight since 1971.

During training or testing
In addition to accidents during spaceflights, 11 astronauts, test pilots, and other personnel have been killed during training or tests.

Non-fatal incidents during spaceflight
Apart from actual disasters, 38 missions resulted in some very near misses and also some training accidents that nearly resulted in deaths.

Non-fatal training accidents

Spaceflight-related accidents and incidents during assembly, testing, and preparation for flight of crewed and uncrewed spacecraft have occasionally resulted in injuries or the loss of craft since the earliest days of space programs. 35 accidents since 2009.

Non-astronaut fatalities

Fatalities caused by rocket explosions
This list excludes deaths caused by military operations, either by deliberate detonations, or accidental during production - for example German V-2 rockets reportedly caused on average an estimated 6 deaths per operational rocket just during its production stages. Over 113 fatalities.

Other non-astronaut fatalities
45 fatalities.

See also

Spaceflight non-fatal training accidents
Criticism of the Space Shuttle program
Fallen Astronaut
International Association for the Advancement of Space Safety
Lost Cosmonauts
Skylab 4
Space exposure
Space Shuttle
International Space Station maintenance
Space station

Notes

References

Books and journals

Other online sources

External links
The Encyclopedia Astronautica
Manned space programs accident/incident summaries (1963 - 1969) - NASA report (PDF format)
The Crash Site of the X-15A-3
Manned space programs accident/incident summaries (1970 - 1971) - NASA report (PDF format)
Interactive Space Shuttle Disaster Memorial
Raw Video Reconstruction of Space Shuttle Columbia Re-entry and More
Significant Incidents & Close Calls in Human Spaceflight

Lists of disasters
 
Human spaceflight
Lists of people by cause of death
Spaceflight timelines

Lists of transport accidents and incidents